Valery Nikolaevich Solodchuk (born 24 March 1971) is an officer of the Russian Army. He holds the rank of lieutenant general, and is currently commander of the 36th Combined Arms Army of the Russian Armed Forces.

Biography 
He served in the positions of platoon commander to chief of staff of a regiment. In 2004 he graduated from the Combined Arms Academy of the Armed Forces of the Russian Federation.

Solodchuk graduated from the Military Academy of the General Staff of the Armed Forces of Russia in 2012, and between 2012 and 2014 commanded the 7th Guards Mountain Air Assault Division of the Russian Airborne Forces. Between fall 2014 and late spring 2015 he was commander of the 1st army corps operating in Donetsk, Ukraine of the 12th Reserve Component Command of the Southern Military District.
Between 2015 and 2017 he was Deputy Commander of the 5th Combined Arms Army of the Eastern Military District, and then from 2017 to 2020 Chief of Staff of the 36th Combined Arms Army, stationed in Buryatia. In January 2020 he became commander of the 36th Army. In December 2021 he was promoted to the rank of Lieutenant General.

At the beginning of the 2022 Russian invasion of Ukraine on February 24, 2022, Solodchuk's command led the unsuccessful Battle of Kyiv. Invading from Belarus, a substantial portion of the 36th Army were stopped, then repelled by the Ukrainian Armed Forces west of Kyiv in March, 2022.

On May 30, 2022, an audio recording allegedly from an intercepted phone call from a Russian soldier inside Ukraine described how Solodchuk threatened to kill his own soldiers after they refused orders to initiate an attack. After allegedly ordering his Russian special forces close protection detail to raise weapons at the non-complying Russian soldiers, Solodchuk fled the area after a Russian soldier pulled out a hand grenade and threatened Solodchuk's life.

Awards 
Order of Military Merit
Medal of the Order "For Merit to the Fatherland", II degree

References

External links 
 Командующий войсками ВВО вручил штандарт новому командующему общевойсковой армией
 Ведь это наши горы...
 Улан-Удэ. Генерал-майор Валерий Николаевич Солодчук, командующий 36-й общевойсковой армии, на "коронавирусном" параде (24.06.2020)
 В Бурятии к празднованию Дня Победы восстановят легендарный танк ИС-2
 Servicemen of the Russian Armed Forces who took part in combat actions in Ukraine

Military Academy of the General Staff of the Armed Forces of Russia alumni
Ryazan Guards Higher Airborne Command School alumni
Recipients of the Medal of the Order "For Merit to the Fatherland" II class
Recipients of the Order of Military Merit (Russia)
Living people
1971 births